Virginio Ferrari is an Italian sculptor, born in Verona and based in Chicago from the middle of the 1960s. He has had more than 50 solo exhibitions and participated in more than 150 group shows.  Ferrari Studios, a site for both Virginio and his son Marco, is at 412 S. Wells, 3rd Floor, Chicago, Illinois 60607.

Artistic Development
Ferrari was educated at the Istituto d'Arte N. Nanni and the Accademia di Belle Arti di Verona. His father and grandfather were both stonecutters.  From 1966 until 1976, he was the artist in residence and professor of art at the University of Chicago. Chicago contains more than thirty of his public sculptures. 

In his early works, Ferrari worked in an abstract and surrealist style but later began to produce monumental sculptures in bronze, steel, iron, marble and granite. His sculptures have been installed in many large US cities and often involve a dialogue between the interiority of the work and the exterior space. 

Ferrari, in his own words, describes his idea about the role of the modern, urban artist: "In an urban environment with its social problems, the individual can decide either to become involved or to remain indifferent, but he must make that choice again each day since the problem remains."

Dialogo at the University of Chicago

His sculpture Dialogo, in front of Pick Hall at 5828 South University Avenue on the University of Chicago is famous on campus because of the shadow it casts at noon each May Day. The shadow clearly shows a sickle very similar to that found in the flag of the former Soviet Union. It also shows a second object which student legend claims is a hammer. The object is clearly in the proper position to be a hammer from the communist flag and intersects the sickle at the correct place. However, the shape of the head of the hammer differs somewhat from that of the flag.

Each year, a crowd of several dozen curious bystanders gathers to observe the formation of the shadow around noon. Ferrari himself has denied that he intended his sculpture to cast such a shadow.

Exhibits
 1967, Renaissance Society at the University of Chicago 
 2003, Galleria d'Arte Moderna e Contemporanea Palazzo Forti di Verona,

Awards
1977, Illinois State Service Award
 1993, Cavaliere Ufficiale della Repubblica Italiana for his contributions in the international field of art

Important Public Art
Being Born (1983) 600 N. Orleans, Chicago, IL
Dialogo (1973) in front of Pick Hall, 5828 South University Avenue, Hyde Park, Chicago
 Super Strength (1996), University of Illinois-Chicago
 Ombre della Sera (2001) Galleria d'Arte Moderna e Contemporanea Palazzo Forti, Verona Italy
 La Famiglia (2001), Pietra di Verona, Public Park, Borgo Nuovo, Verona, Italy
 Elementi Circolari in Movimento (2002), Public City Pool, Borgo Roma, Verona, Italy

External links
 Biography on International Sculpture Center http://www.sculpture.org/portfolio/sculptorPage?sculptor_id=1000578]
 Images of his work 

Year of birth missing (living people)
Living people
University of Chicago faculty
Artists from Chicago
Sculptors from Illinois